Michael David Ruffin (born January 21, 1977) is an American former professional basketball player currently working as an assistant coach for the Phoenix Suns of the National Basketball Association (NBA). At 6'8" and 248 lbs, he played as a forward/center.

Basketball career
After playing college basketball at the University of Tulsa, where he studied chemical engineering, Ruffin was drafted in the second round of the 1999 NBA Draft by the Chicago Bulls. He has played for the Bulls, the Philadelphia 76ers, the Utah Jazz, the Washington Wizards, the Milwaukee Bucks, and the Portland Trail Blazers. He averaged 1.7 points and 3.9 rebounds per game through his NBA career and is considered to be a defensive presence on the court. Ruffin's best statistical season came with the 2000-01 Bulls, where tallied career best averages in rebounding (5.8) and scoring (2.6).

On March 30, 2007, Ruffin was part of a dubious blooper that indirectly cost the Wizards a game. Up 109-106 on the Toronto Raptors, with less than four seconds remaining in regulation, Ruffin intercepted an inbound pass. In an attempt to run the clock out, Ruffin tossed the ball in the air, but it landed in the hands of Toronto's Morris Peterson, who sank a game-tying three-pointer as time expired. Forced into overtime, Washington lost the game 123-118.

On February 17, 2009, Ruffin was sent to the Sacramento Kings and then to the Portland Trail Blazers for Ike Diogu shortly thereafter in a 3-team trade.

In 2010, Ruffin became coach of the ABA's Colorado Kings. However, he resumed his career in Spain playing for Obradoiro CAB.

After two years out of the NBA, Ruffin was signed by the league's Denver Nuggets in mid-December 2011. However, he did not make the team's opening day roster.

Post-NBA career
As of 2012, Ruffin was living in Phoenix, Arizona, working for ASQ and coaching basketball.

Ruffin joined the New Orleans Pelicans as Player Development Coach in October 2014.

In January 2021, Ruffin became an assistant coach for the Fort Wayne Mad Ants of the NBA G League.

On September 24, 2021, Ruffin joined the Phoenix Suns as an assistant coach.

NBA career statistics

Regular season 

|-
| align="left" | 
| align="left" | Chicago
| 71 || 6 || 13.7 || .420 || .000 || .489 || 3.5 || .6 || .4 || .4 || 2.2
|-
| align="left" | 
| align="left" | Chicago
| 45 || 16 || 19.5 || .444 || .000 || .506 || 5.5 || 0.9 || .6 || .8 || 2.6
|-
| align="left" | 
| align="left" | Philadelphia
| 15 || 0 || 11.3 || .269 || .000 || .250 || 3.4 || .3 || .3 || .5 || 1.1
|-
| align="left" | 
| align="left" | Utah
| 41 || 23 || 17.9 || .325 || .000 || .421 || 5.0 || 1.0 || .5 || .5 || 2.2
|-
| align="left" | 
| align="left" | Washington
| 79 || 7 || 16.0 || .414 || .000 || .433 || 4.2 || .8 || .5 || .5 || 1.4
|-
| align="left" | 
| align="left" | Washington
| 76 || 4 || 13.3 || .442 || .000 || .500 || 3.6 || .4 || .4 || .4 || 1.4
|-
| align="left" | 
| align="left" | Washington
| 30 || 0 || 9.0 || .278 || .000 || .368 || 2.1 || .2 || .2 || .3 || .6
|-
| align="left" | 
| align="left" | Milwaukee
| 46 || 2 || 13.7 || .532 || .000 || .397 || 4.0 || .5 || .7 || .4 || 2.0
|-
| align="left" | 
| align="left" | Portland
| 11 || 0 || 3.2 || .286 || .000 || 1.000 || 1.0 || .0 || .3 || .1 || .5
|- class="sortbottom"
| style="text-align:center;" colspan="2"| Career
| 414 || 58 || 14.4 || .407 || .000 || .459 || 3.9 || .6 || .5 || .4 || 1.7

Playoffs 

|-
| align="left" | 2005
| align="left" | Washington
| 9 || 0 || 17.3 || .700 || .000 || .563 || 4.1 || 1.0 || .3 || .3 || 2.6
|-
| align="left" | 2006
| align="left" | Washington
| 6 || 0 || 11.7 || .500 || .000 || .000 || 2.7 || .7 || .2 || .3 || .3
|-
| align="left" | 2007
| align="left" | Washington
| 4 || 0 || 7.0 || .333 || .000 || .000 || 2.3 || .0 || .8 || .0 || .5
|-
| align="left" | 2009
| align="left" | Portland
| 1 || 0 || 5.0 || .000 || .000 || .500 || 5.0 || .0 || .0 || .0 || 1.0
|- class="sortbottom"
| style="text-align:center;" colspan="2"| Career
| 20 || 0 || 13.0 || .563 || .000 || .500 || 3.4 || .7 || .4 || .3 || 1.4

References

External links

NBA.com Profile - Michael Ruffin

Spanish League profile

1977 births
Living people
American expatriate basketball people in Spain
American men's basketball players
Basketball players from Denver
Bàsquet Manresa players
Centers (basketball)
Chicago Bulls draft picks
Chicago Bulls players
Fort Wayne Mad Ants coaches
Liga ACB players
Medalists at the 1997 Summer Universiade
Milwaukee Bucks players
New Orleans Pelicans assistant coaches
Obradoiro CAB players
Philadelphia 76ers players
Phoenix Suns assistant coaches
Portland Trail Blazers players
Power forwards (basketball)
Sportspeople from Denver
Tulsa Golden Hurricane men's basketball players
Utah Jazz players
Washington Wizards players
Universiade medalists in basketball
Universiade gold medalists for the United States